Ophisops beddomei, commonly known as Beddome's snake-eye or Beddome’ s lacerta,  is a species of lizard in the family Lacertidae. The species is a diurnal and fast-moving terrestrial lizard, which is endemic to the Western Ghats of India.

Geographic range
O. beddomei is found in Western India in the Indian states of Goa, Gujarat, Karnataka, Kerala, Maharashta, and Tamil Nadu.

The type locality is given as  "Bremnagherry hills" (Brahmagiri Hills), Wayanad.

Etymology
The specific name, beddomei, is in honor of Richard Henry Beddome, (1830-1911) British army officer and botanist.

Description
O. beddomei is very similar to O. jerdonii.  O. beddomei has two or three frontonasals on a transverse line, one or two azygos prefrontals nearly always are present, and the first and fourth supraoculars are usually broken up into several very small shields or granules. Lateral scales are distinctly smaller than the dorsals; 28 to 32 scales occur around the body. Femoral pores number eight to 13. Coloration is as in O. jerdonii, but the upper lateral light streak is frequently absent.

Habitat

Diet
O. beddomei preys upon insects.

Reproduction
O. beddomei is oviparous.

References

Further reading
Beddome RH (1870). "Descriptions of new reptiles from the Madras Presidency". Madras Monthly Journal of Medical Science 2: 169-176. [Reprint. 1940: Journal of the Society for the Bibliography of Natural Science, London 1 (10): 327-334.]
Gayen NC (1999). "A synopsis of the reptiles of Gujarat, western India". Hamadryad 24 (1): 1-22.
Jerdon TC (1870). "Notes on Indian Herpetology". Proceedings of the Asiatic Society of Bengal March 1870: 66-85. (Pseudophiops beddomei, new species, p. 72).
Vyas R (2003). "First record of Ophisops beddomei (Jerdon, 1870) from Gujarat State, western India". Hamadryad 27 (2): 280-281.

External links

Ophisops
Reptiles of India
Reptiles described in 1870
Taxa named by Thomas C. Jerdon